Valentin Bosioc (born Valentin George Bosioc on 13 January 1983) is a Romanian professional bodybuilder and fitness model, as well as certified fitness instructor, personal trainer and nutritionist. He rose to prominence by winning Musclemania Paris and placing second in an IFBB Romania competition in 2015, among other prizes. In 2018, Bosioc also reached the semi-finals of Ninja Warrior România. He has been credited as an influencer and is the most followed Romanian sportsperson on Facebook.

Early life and career
Valentin George Bosioc was born on 13 January 1983 in the city of Reșița, and spent his childhood in Bocșa, Romania. His father Iosif was a football player, while his brother Bogdan Ionuț is a handball instructor. Starting with the age of 13 Bosioc showed special interest in bodybuilding and began taking judo, mixed martial arts, boxing, calisthenics, football, rugby and aikido classes, among others. While attending the Tata Oancea High School in Bocșa, Romanian boxer Francisc Vaștag desired to scout him, but he eventually refused the offer.

Bosioc later graduated from the Politehnica University of Timișoara, receiving a degree in engineering. He worked in this field for a short period of time, as well as in public relations and journalism, but gave up to pursue a career as a professional bodybuilder, fitness model, fitness instructor, personal trainer and nutritionist, for which he studied in Romania and the United Kingdom. Bosioc rose to prominence by winning Musclemania Paris and placing second in an IFBB Romania competition in November 2015, among other prizes. In 2018, he also appeared on the first season of Ninja Warrior România, managing to reach the semi-finals.

A master trainer at Fitness Education School in Bucharest, Romania as of December 2018, Bosioc has worked with several celebrities, most notably with Romanian singer Delia Matache and Cronica Cârcotașilor host Ioana Petric. He has been credited as an influencer and is signed to Romanian agency Global Influencers. Cotidianul and Biz labelled him one of the most influential fitness bloggers in Romania, with him also being the most followed Romanian sportsperson on Facebook (7th person overall in the country as of February 2019). He has written two books, The Path to Perfect Abs and Get Guns, as well as developed his own training concept, Full Body Ignition (FBI). As of April 2020, he has been uploading workout videos to his YouTube channel for over nine years and also uses his Facebook page for similar scopes.

Personal life
Bosioc is married to a Romanian woman named Ana Cristina and is the father of a daughter, Eila Maria. They currently reside in Bucharest.

References

External links
Official website

1983 births
Living people
Romanian bodybuilders
Male bodybuilders
Professional bodybuilders
People from Reșița